Tanah Surga... Katanya (Paradise's Land... They Say) is a 2012 Indonesian drama film directed by Herwin Novianto. The film won four awards at the Indonesian Film Festival in 2012, including Best Feature Film.

Accolades

References 

2010s Indonesian-language films
2012 films
2012 drama films
Indonesian drama films
Films set in Kalimantan